WMSJ (89.3 FM; "K-LOVE") is a radio station airing the K-Love contemporary Christian music format, licensed to Freeport, Maine and serving the Portland area. The station is owned by Educational Media Foundation. WMSJ's programming is also heard on a translator in Lawrence, Massachusetts, W260AS (99.9 FM).

History
The 89.3 FM facility signed on November 29, 1997. WMSJ's programming had originated in July 1993 on 91.9 FM in Harpswell; after 89.3 went on the air, the 91.9 frequency was sold to the Bible Broadcasting Network and became WYFP. Originally known as "Joy 89.3," the station rebranded to "Positive 89.3" in July 2005. W260AS in Lawrence signed on in February 2008.

By September 2010, the station's owner, The Positive Radio Network, shared several board members with Bethesda Christian Broadcasting, another operator of religious radio stations; the following year, WMSJ was transferred to Bethesda. In January 2015, Bethesda Christian Broadcasting reached a deal to sell WMSJ to Educational Media Foundation; the sale closed on June 10, 2015, at a purchase price of $925,000, at which point the station joined EMF's K-Love network.

Previous logo

References

External links

MSJ
Freeport, Maine
Radio stations established in 1998
1998 establishments in Maine
K-Love radio stations
Educational Media Foundation radio stations